Persicula is a taxonomic genus of minute to small predatory sea snails, marine gastropod mollusks.  It includes several species which are micromollusks.

This genus is placed in the family Cystiscidae. It was previously in the family Marginellidae the margin snails. Both families are within the order Neogastropoda.

(Note: Gastropod taxonomy has been in flux for more than half a century, and this is especially true currently, because of new research in molecular phylogeny. Because of all the ongoing changes, different reliable sources can yield very different classifications.)

Habitat 
Species in this genus live from the intertidal zone to 370 m in depth.

Shell description 
In this genus the shell is minute to small. It can be uniformly colored or white, and the color can be patterned. The shell is moderately thick to thick. The spire is usually immersed. The lip of the aperture is thickened, and weakly to strongly lirate.

An external varix can be present or absent. There is a distinct siphonal notch present and a posterior notch is also present. The columella is multiplicate, with 4 to 13 plications plus parietal lirae.

Description of soft parts
The animal has long tentacles, and the siphon is also usually long. The mantle appears not to extend completely over the external shell surface.

Species 
The separation between the genera Persicula and Gibberula is not well-defined. It is based on morphological differences with the larger species (showing a complex color pattern) belonging to Persicula, while the smaller species (showing a banded or uniform color pattern) belong to Gibberula. Many species with characteristics that fall between the two extremes, are ambiguous. Up to now (2010) there is no phylogenetic analysis to substantiate this rather arbitrary classification.

According to the World Register of Marine Species (WoRMS), the following species with valid names are included within the genus Persicula :
 
 Persicula accola B. Roth & Coan, 1968
 Persicula albomaculata (May, 1911)
 Persicula bagne Faber, 2006
 Persicula bahamasensis Petuch, 2002
 Persicula bandera Coan & Roth, 1965
 Persicula blanda Hinds, 1844
 Persicula brinkae Bozzetti, 1993
 Persicula calculus (Redfield, 1870)
Persicula canaryensis (Clover, 1972)
 Persicula chrysomelina (Redfield, 1848)
 Persicula cingulata (Dillwyn, 1817)
 Persicula cordorae Jong & Coomans, 1988
 Persicula cornea (Lamarck, 1822)
Persicula danilai Bozzetti, 1992
Persicula deburghi A. Adams, 1864
Persicula denansiana Ancey, 1881
 Persicula enolae Le Béon, 2014
Persicula frumentum (Sowerby I, 1832)
 Persicula hennequini Boyer, Neefs & Wickfield, 1998
  Persicula hilli Smith, 1950
Persicula imbricata Hinds, 1844
 Persicula ingridmariae T. Cossignani & Lorenz, 2019
 Persicula interruptolineata (Megerle von Mühlfeld, 1816)
 Persicula janae T. Cossignani & Lorenz, 2019
 Persicula maculosa (Kiener, 1834)
 Persicula maldiviana Cossignani, 2001
 Persicula margotae Le Béon, 2015
 Persicula masirana Roth & Petit, 1972
 Persicula moretzsohni Coltro, 2020
 Persicula multilineata Sowerby II, 1846
 Persicula muralis Hinds, 1844
 Persicula passamontii T. Cossignani & Lorenz, 2019
 Persicula persicula (Linnaeus, 1758) 
Persicula phrygia Sowerby III, 1846
 Persicula porcellana Gmelin, 1791
 Persicula pulcherrima Gaskoin, 1849
 Persicula quemeneri Cossignani, 2001
Persicula rashafuni Bozzetti, 1993
Persicula robusta Sowerby III, 1904
Persicula sagittata Hinds, 1844
Persicula shepstonensis Smith, 1906
 Persicula tessellata (Lamarck, 1822)
Persicula testai Bozzetti, 1993
Persicula vanpeli Moolenbeek & van der Bijl, 2008
Persicula weberi Olsson & McGinty, 1958

 Taxa inquirenda
 Persicula adamsiana Pilsbry & Love, 1932  
 Persicula bulbulina Locard, 1897 
 Persicula crossei Vélain, 1877
 Persicula glandina Vélain, 1877 
 Persicula polyodonta Vélain, 1877

Synonyms
 Persicula alborubida Barnard, 1969: synonym of Cystiscus pseustes (E. A. Smith, 1904)
 Persicula aldridgei Nowell-Usticke, 1969: synonym of Gibberula aldridgei (Nowell-Usticke, 1969) (original combination)
 Persicula cassidiforme Gaskoin, 1853 : synonym of Pachybathron cassidiforme (Gaskoin, 1853)
 Persicula catenata Montagu, 1803 : synonym of Gibberula catenata (Montagu, 1803)
 Persicula chudeaui Bavay: synonym of Gibberula chudeaui (Bavay in Dautzenberg, 1910)
 Persicula cypraeoides Adams, 1845 : synonym of Pachybathron cypraeoides (Adams, C.B., 1845)
 Persicula dalli Morretes, 1941: synonym of Archierato dalli (Morretes, 1941) (original combination)
 Persicula dentiformis Thiele, 1930: synonym of Gibberula dentiformis (Thiele, 1930)
 Persicula fluctuata Adams, 1850 : synonym of Gibberula fluctuata (Adams, 1850)
 Persicula grisea Jousseaume, 1875: synonym of Cryptospira grisea (Jousseaume, 1875) (original combination)
 Persicula kienerianum Petit, 1838 : synonym of Pachybathron kieneriana (Petit de la Saussaye, S., 1838)
 Persicula lucens Locard, 1897: synonym of Persicula blanda (Hinds, 1844)
 Persicula lucida (Marrat, 1877): synonym of Hyalina lucida (Marrat, 1877)
 Persicula maculata Swainson, 1840: synonym of Persicula persicula (Linnaeus, 1758)
 Persicula maldiviana T. Cossignani, 2001: synonym of Gibberula maldiviana (T. Cossignani, 2001) (original combination)
 Persicula miliaria (Linnaeus, 1758): synonym of Gibberula miliaria (Linnaeus, 1758)
 Persicula nigrocrocea Barnard, 1969: synonym of Plesiocystiscus aphanospira (Tomlin, 1913)
 Persicula obesa (Redfield, 1846): synonym of Persicula tessellata (Lamarck, 1822)
 Persicula persiculocingulata Tournier, 1997 : synonym of Persicula persicula (Linnaeus, C., 1758)
 Persicula pisiformis Thiele, 1930: synonym of Cystiscus cymbalum (Tate, 1878) (junior synonym)
 Persicula pulchella (Kiener, 1834): synonym of Gibberula pulchella (Kiener, 1834)
 Persicula saharica Locard, 1897: synonym of Persicula blanda (Hinds, 1844)
 Persicula tantilla Gould, 1860: synonym of Granulina tantilla  (Gould, 1860) (original combination)
 Persicula tayrona Diaz & Velasquez, 1987: synonym of Pachybathron tayrona Díaz, J.M. & Velasquez, 1987
 Persicula thomensis (Tomlin, 1919): synonym of Gibberula thomensis (Tomlin, 1919)
 Persicula variabilis Schumacher, 1817: synonym of Persicula persicula (Linnaeus, 1758)

References

 Cossignani T. (2006). Marginellidae & Cystiscidae of the World. L'Informatore Piceno. 408pp

 
Gastropod genera
Cystiscidae